The 33rd Annual TV Week Logie Awards was held on Friday 15 March 1991 at the World Congress Centre in Melbourne, and broadcast on the Nine Network. The ceremony was hosted by Daryl Somers and guests included Angie Dickinson, Michael Ontkean and Peggy Lipton.

Nominees and winners
Winners are listed first and highlighted in bold.

Gold Logie

Acting/Presenting

Most Popular Programs/Videos

Most Outstanding Programs

Performers
Debra Byrne and the Super Band
Mark Williams
Electric Legs

Hall of Fame
After a lifetime in the Australian television industry, James Davern became the eighth inductee into the TV Week Logies Hall of Fame.

References

External links
 

1991 television awards
1991 in Australian television
1991